Marmara is an archipelagic district of Balıkesir Province, Turkey. It comprises Marmara, Avşa, Ekinlik and Paşalimanı islands along with the neighbouring smaller islands. The population is 2,425 (as of 2010). The mayor is Süleyman Aksoy (AKP).

References

Populated places in Balıkesir Province
Districts of Balıkesir Province